Arthur Leslie Fewster (18 October 1894 – 13 January 1960) was an Australian rules footballer who played for the Richmond Football Club in the Victorian Football League (VFL).

Notes

External links 
		

1894 births
1960 deaths
Australian rules footballers from Victoria (Australia)
Richmond Football Club players
Prahran Football Club players